New Wave  may refer to:

Music
 New wave music, a broad rock/pop genre that originated in the 1970s
 New wave of British heavy metal, originating in the late 1970s

Albums
 New Wave (Against Me! album) or the title song, 2007
 New Wave (The Auteurs album), 1993
 New Wave (Dizzy Gillespie album), 1962
 New Wave (Powerman 5000 album), 2017
 New Wave (compilation album), a new wave/punk compilation album, 1977
 New Wave (EP), a 2022 EP by Cravity
 New Wave, an extended play by The Saints, 1977
 newWAVE, a 2018 album by Dat Adam
 New Waves, a 2017 album by Bone Thugs

Songs
"New Wave", a song by Brookes Brothers, 2018
"New Wave", a song by The Parkinsons, 2004
"New Wave Song", a song by Turbonegro from Hot Cars and Spent Contraceptives, 1992
"The New Wave", a 1994 single by Daft Punk later included on their debut album Homework as "Alive"

Other
 New Wave (movement), various artistic movements in film and music
 French New Wave, a French art film movement which emerged in the late 1950s
 Japanese New Wave, a group of loosely-connected Japanese filmmakers during the late 1950s and into the 1970s
 New Wave (political party), a political party in South Korea
New Wave science fiction, a movement in science fiction
 New Wave (design), a typographical design philosophy
 NewWave, a software product released by Hewlett-Packard circa 1988
 The New Wave (comics), a 1986 comic book by Eclipse Comics
 New Wave (competition), an annual international competition of young singers of popular music
 New Wave Kitakyushu, a Japanese football (soccer) club
 A New Wave, a 2006 American film

See also
 Nouvelle Vague (disambiguation)
 New Age (disambiguation)